The Brattleboro Typographic Company was a printing company in Brattleboro, Vermont founded on October 26, 1836, as a successor to the firm Holbrook & Fessenden. The company started with $150,000 in Capital and eight power printing presses. The company issued large editions of the bible alongside other nationally distributed publications. The company initiated what would become a very successful publishing industry in the town. Notably, the printing company was one of the few publishers at the time who manufactured their own paper for printing.

References 

Brattleboro, Vermont
1836 establishments in Vermont